Patnos District is a district of Ağrı Province of Turkey. Its seat is the town Patnos. Its area is 1,394 km2, and its population is 118,481 (2021).

Composition
There are two municipalities in Patnos District:
 Dedeli
 Patnos

There are 92 villages in Patnos District:

 Akçaören
 Akdilek
 Aktepe 
 Akyemiş
 Alatay
 Andaçlı
 Armutlu
 Aşağıgöçmez
 Aşağıkamışlı
 Bağbaşı
 Baltacık
 Baştarla
 Bozoğlak
 Budak
 Çakırbey
 Çamurlu
 Çaputlu
 Çatmaoluk
 Çavuşköy
 Çiçek
 Çimenli
 Çukurbağ
 Dağalan
 Değirmendüzü
 Demirören
 Derecik
 Dizginkale
 Doğansu 
 Düzceli
 Edremit
 Ergeçli
 Eryılmaz
 Esenbel
 Eskikonak
 Gençali
 Gökçeali
 Gökoğlu
 Gönlüaçık
 Güllüce
 Günbeli
 Gündüz
 Güvercinli
 Hacılar
 Hasandolu
 Hisarköy
 Karatoklu
 Karbasan
 Kaş
 Kazanbey
 Keçelbaba
 Kızıltepe
 Kızkapan
 Koçaklar
 Konakbeyi
 Köseler
 Kucak
 Kuruyaka
 Kuşkaya
 Kürekli
 Meydandağı
 Mollaibrahim
 Onbaşılar
 Ortadamla
 Oyacık
 Örendik
 Özdemir
 Pirömer
 Sağrıca
 Sarıdibek
 Suluca
 Susuz
 Tanyeli
 Taşkın
 Tepeli
 Usluca
 Uzunca
 Uzungün
 Üçoymak
 Ürküt
 Yalçınkaya
 Yeşilhisar
 Yeşilyurt
 Yukarıdamla
 Yukarıgöçmez
 Yukarıkamışlı
 Yukarıkülecik
 Yurtöven
 Yüncüler
 Yürekveren
 Zincirkale
 Zirekli
 Ziyaret

References

Districts of Ağrı Province